The Birsa Munda Football Stadium is a stadium in Ranchi, India. Opened in 2009, it is the second stadium used by Ranchi Football clubs after the Birsa Munda athletics Stadium (not to be confused with).

References

Football venues in Jharkhand
Sports venues in Ranchi
Memorials to Birsa Munda
2009 establishments in Jharkhand
Sports venues completed in 2009